Harry Street (1919-1984) was a well known British jurist and legal scholar. He spent much of his life at the University of Manchester. His work was wide-ranging but most notably included work on civil liberties and the law of torts. Street on Torts  is, as of 2018, in its 15th edition.

Selected publications 
 Street, H. (1982). Freedom, the Individual, and the Law. Penguin Books.
 Street, H., Brazier, M., & Britain, G. (1955). The law of torts (pp. 170–72). Butterworth.
 Street, H. (1968). Justice in the Welfare State (Vol. 20). Sweet & Maxwell.

References

External links
Harry Street Papers, University of Manchester Library, University of Manchester

English legal professionals
1919 births
1984 deaths